László Szabó (born 1905, date of death unknown) was a Hungarian fencing master.  He was born in Târgu Mureș.  He is known for his book Fencing and The Master, a classic of modern fencing.  He wrote it after a lifetime of accumulating knowledge, including learning to teach fencing from his beloved maestro Italo Santelli.

1905 births
Year of death missing
Hungarian male fencers